The Steal is a 1995 British comedy thriller film directed by John Hay and starring Alfred Molina, Helen Slater and Peter Bowles.

Premise
A London lawyer attempts to get even with a property development company who have cheated some poor islanders out of their land.

Cast
 Alfred Molina - Cliff
 Helen Slater - Kim
 Peter Bowles - Lord Childwell
 Dinsdale Landen - Sir Wilmot
 Heathcote Williams - Jeremiah
 Stephen Fry - Wimborne
 Bryan Pringle - Cecil, Bank Doorman
 Patricia Hayes - Mrs Fawkes
 Jack Dee - Wilmot's Servant
 Ian Porter - Beggar
 Lindsay Holiday - Jimmy
 Ann Bryson - Bank Transfer Clerk
 Sara Crowe - Bank Transfer Secretary
 Gabrielle Drake - Anthea

References

External links

1995 films
1990s comedy thriller films
British comedy thriller films
1995 comedy films
1990s English-language films
1990s British films